Jack Pierson (born 1960 in Plymouth, Massachusetts) is a photographer and an artist. Pierson is known for his photographs, collages, word sculptures, installations, drawings and artists books. His "Self-Portrait" series was shown in the 2004 Whitney Biennial. His works are held in numerous museum collections.

Work
Pierson's practice embodies an array of media spanning from wall-drawings, word-pieces, installations, drawings, paintings and photographs. He is considered to be part of a group of photographers known as the Boston School -- David Armstrong, Philip-Lorca diCorcia, Nan Goldin, Mark Morrisroe and twins Doug and Mike Starn, among others. All of them knew one another in the early 1980s and photographed their immediate circle of friends in situations that were, or appeared to be, casual or intimate.

Pierson first began making his Word Sculptures in 1991, utilizing found objects – mismatched letters salvaged from junkyards, old movie marquees, roadside diners, Las Vegas casinos, and other forsaken enterprises. The word sculptures create individual words or phrases that evoke a multiplicity of meanings.

Commissioned in 1997 by the artistic collective Bernadette Corporation, Pierson's video Past Life in Egypt is a collaboration with Ursula Hodel, who plays an outrageous and glamorous dominatrix in the video. At one point, her character sadly recounts her past life as a wicked queen of Egypt, in love with a much younger man and impervious to the suffering of her people. The narrative is at times humorous, sensational and spectacular, but is ultimately grounded in the haze of past memories and the regrets of a past life.

In 2003, Pierson published Self Portrait, a book of photographs which features 15 images of beautiful men, arranged to suggest the arc of a lifetime—beginning with a young boy and progressing to old age with men in various stages of undress; none of the images is of the artist himself.

In 2006, inspired by an earlier series of pencil drawings he did from an old postcard of a woman's face, Pierson produced a suite of twelve large-scale silkscreen paintings, all linear graphics in black ink on diffused, off-white linen. Removed from its original and singular representation in a photograph, the portrayed woman's facade is variously multiplied by hand and then enlarged by the machine-like reproduction of silkscreen.

In a group of what Pierson refers to as "first page drawings", original texts from various female authors, already multiplied by machine to the printed word, are returned to the realm of the singular and handwritten original. Pierson diligently copies the first page of books-penned by Barbara Pym, Jean Rhys, Sister Wendy and Marilyn Monroe, among others-on 11 x 14 inch paper.

Other projects
Pierson's work is regularly commissioned for magazines and he has undertaken photography projects for several luxury fashion houses. Commissioned by the Italian luxury label Bottega Veneta, he photographed models Liya Kebede, Karmen Pedaru and Alexandre Cunha for the men and women's 2012 spring/summer ad campaign along Coconut Grove, Florida.

For the project The Source, artist Doug Aitken filmed a conversation with Pierson, exploring the essence of his creative process.

Collections
Pierson's work is included in the collections of: 
the Museum of Contemporary Art North Miami, 
the San Francisco Museum of Modern Art,
the Museum of Modern Art, New York, 
the Whitney Museum of American Art, 
the Metropolitan Museum of Art,
the Museum of Contemporary Art Chicago,
the Art Institute of Chicago, 
the Wadsworth Atheneum Museum of Art, 
the Los Angeles Museum of Contemporary Art, 
the Los Angeles County Museum of Art, and
the Irish Museum of Modern Art.

Art market
Pierson is represented by Xavier Hufkens, Thaddaeus Ropac, Regen Projects and Lisson Gallery (since 2022).

References

External links
 Official site

1960 births
Living people
American photographers
American gay artists
American LGBT photographers
LGBT people from Massachusetts
Massachusetts College of Art and Design alumni